The Practice Statement [1966] 3 All ER 77 was a statement made in the House of Lords by Lord Gardiner LC on 26 July 1966 on behalf of himself and the Lords of Appeal in Ordinary, that they would depart from precedent in the Lords in order to achieve justice.

Background
Until the year 1966, the House of Lords in the United Kingdom was bound to follow all of its previous decisions under the principle of stare decisis, even if this created "injustice" and "unduly restrict(s) the proper development of the law" (London Tramways Co. v London County Council [1898] AC 375). The Practice Statement 1966 is authority for the House of Lords to depart from their previous decisions. It does not affect the precedential value of cases in lower courts; all other courts that recognise the Supreme Court (formerly the House of Lords) as the court of last resort are still bound by Supreme Court (and House of Lords) decisions. Before this, the only way a binding precedent could be avoided was to create new legislation on the matter.

A germane example is the case of Anderton v Ryan (1985) where the House of Lords interpreted the Criminal Attempts Act 1981 in such a way as to make the Act virtually ineffective. Only one year later in R v Shivpuri (1986) Lord Bridge (a member of the erroneous majority in Anderton) acknowledged the error and said "the Practice Statement is an effective abandonment of our pretension to infallibility. If a serious error embodied in a decision of this House has been distorted by the law, the sooner it is corrected the better".

By contrast, in  Knuller v DPP, Lord Reid, who had previously given a strong dissenting judgment in Shaw v DPP, said while he still disagreed with the majority decision in that case, in the interests of certainty he would not overturn Shaw (even though the Practice Statement had given authority to do so).

Suggestions that a rigid adherence to stare decisis be dropped had been made prior to 1966, initially by Lord Wright in an article for the Cambridge Law Journal in 1943, and by Lord Gardiner and others in the 1963 book, Law Reform Now.

Content
This is the text of the Practice Statement:

Reception

Louis Blom-Cooper described the change brought about by the Practice Statement as being as if the Lords "dropped a pebble into the judicial pool that produced not merely a few ripples but also a seismic wave in English juridicial thinking ... the story of that legally historic event displays the carapace of traditional English lawyers' disinclination readily to accept radical change and to the cautious application of such change, once it is ultimately conceded".

Following the passage of the Constitutional Reform Act 2005, the Supreme Court of the United Kingdom was established in 2009. It follows the precedent of its predecessor. In Austin v Mayor and Burgesses of the London Borough of Southwark Lord Hope, writing for the majority, comments on the Practice Statement's applicability to the new court:

Invocations in case law 

Between 1966 and the replacement of the House of Lords by the Supreme Court in 2010, the Practice Statement was explicitly invoked in 21 cases, including:

 Conway v Rimmer, overruling Duncan v Cammell Laird Co
 Herrington v British Railways Board, overruling Robert Addie & Sons (Colliers) Ltd v Dumbreck
 R v Shivpuri, overruling Anderton v Ryan
 R v G, overruling R v Caldwell
 Murphy v Brentwood DC, overruling Anns v Merton LBC

See also
Re Spectrum Plus Ltd
Young v Bristol Aeroplane Co Ltd—sets out when the Court of Appeal may depart from its own precedent

Notes

1966 in law
1966 in the United Kingdom
Statements (law)
House of Lords
1966 documents
1966 speeches